Oughton is a surname. Notable people with the surname include:

Adolphus Oughton (c. 1685–1736), British Army officer and politician
Diana Oughton (1942–1970), American radical
Duncan Oughton (born 1977), New Zealand (soccer) footballer
George Oughton (1842–1898), bandleader and organist in South Australia, son of Samuel
Jack Oughton (1876– after 1940), American stonemason
James Adolphus Oughton (1720–1780), British soldier
James H. Oughton (1913–1996), American businessman and politician
Samuel Oughton (1803–1881), Baptist missionary to Jamaica

See also
Hitchin Oughton, an electoral ward in England
Oughtonhead
Orton (disambiguation)